Wichard von Alvensleben (May 19, 1902 – August 14, 1982) was a German agriculturist, Wehrmacht Officer, and Knight of the Order of Saint John.  He was a member of the aristocratic House of Alvensleben, one of the oldest in Germany.

Then a captain, Alvensleben was the commander of Wehrmacht troops stationed in April 1945 at Bozen, whence he led a detachment of infantry to liberate a group of high-status prisoners being held by the SS at Niederdorf in the Italian Tyrol. It is a curious coincidence of history that his brother SS-Colonel Ludolf Jakob von Alvensleben was commander (SS und Police Leader) of all SS troops in the area (Adria-West) at that time.

Early life

Alvensleben was born on May 19, 1902, in Wittenmoor (now part of Stendal) to Ludolf Udo von Alvensleben (1852–1923) and Ida, née von Glasenapp (1866–1924). He was taught in various convent schools at Magdeburg in Brandenburg an der Havel and passed his Abitur in 1921 at the Klosterschule Roßleben. After four years of practical training he commenced studies in agriculture, forestry, and law in Eberswalde and Munich.

In 1927, Alvensleben married Cora von Erxleben and started to work at his wife's country estates at Tankow-Seegenfelde in the district of Friedeberg, then in the Province of Brandenburg, part of the German Free State of Prussia, and at Dertzow in the district of Soldin, New March, also in the Province of Brandenburg, in 1929. In 1936, he bought the forested estate of Viarthlum, in the district of Rummelsburg, in the Free State Province of Pomerania. All were in areas transferred to Poland by the Potsdam Agreement in August 1945 following the end of World War II.

Alvensleben had two daughters, born in 1934 and 1936.  A deeply religious Christian, he had become by then a Knight of Justice of the Order of Saint John.

Military service

In 1939, Alvensleben became an Officer of the German Wehrmacht, earning the rank of Captain, and served in Poland, France, Russia, Africa, and Italy. He was wounded in 1941 in Russia and received various decorations, including the Wound Badge, the Infantry Assault Badge, and the Iron Cross 1st Class.

On 29 January 1945, his wife committed suicide at the arrival of the Soviet Red Army at the family estate in Tankow-Seegenfelde.

In late April 1945, a group of 140 high-status prisoners (Prominenten) were transferred to Tyrol, guarded by SS troops. A Wehrmacht colonel among the prisoners contacted senior German army officers, made known the identity of these prisoners, and conveyed the apprehension that they were all to be executed. A regular German army unit under the command of Captain von Alvensleben was assigned by nearby military authorities to protect the prisoners. Outnumbered, the SS guards moved out, leaving the prisoners behind. The prisoners were then set free, with the majority opting for sanctuary for a time in Pragser Wildsee under the protection of Alvensleben's troops until a U.S. force arrived to take custody.

After the war

In autumn 1945, Alvensleben was released from U.S. custody and started to work as a transport operator in a sugar refinery in Nörten-Hardenberg. In August 1946, Alvensleben married Astrid von Brand (widowed von Brockdorff-Ahlefeldt)  and in 1952 he became an administrator of the von Brockdorff estate Ascheberg near Plön. In 1956, Alvensleben was involved with Diakonisches Werk, a charity organisation of the Lutheran Church at Rendsburg. He retired in 1974 and died on 14 August 1982, in Ascheberg.

See also 
 House of Alvensleben

Literature
Hartmut Jäckel: Menschen in Berlin. Stuttgart, München 2001, S. 46-48.
Hans-Günter Richardi: SS-Geiseln in der Alpenfestung. Bozen 2005

References

External links 
 Liberation of KZ inmates at Tyrol showing a picture of von Alvensleben(German)

1902 births
1982 deaths
People from Stendal
People from the Province of Saxony
Recipients of the Iron Cross (1939), 1st class
German prisoners of war in World War II held by the United States
Protestants in the German Resistance
German farmers
German landowners
Wichard
Eberswalde University for Sustainable Development alumni